DXRD (711 AM) Sonshine Radio is a radio station owned and operated by Sonshine Media Network International. It serves as the flagship station of Sonshine Radio, the radio arm of the Kingdom of Jesus Christ. The station's studio is located at the Kingdom of Jesus Christ compound, Philippine-Japan Friendship Highway, Catitipan, Davao City.

References

Radio stations in Davao City
Radio stations established in 1967
Sonshine Media Network International
News and talk radio stations in the Philippines